Braunsapis cupulifera is a species of bee belonging to the family Apidae and the subfamily Xylocopinae.

References

External links
 Braunsapis cupulifera. Integrated Taxonomic Information System (ITIS)
 Braunsapis cupulifera. Animal Diversity Web.
 Karunaratne, W., et al. An updated checklist of bees of Sri Lanka with new records. National Science Foundation. 2005.

Xylocopinae
Insects of Sri Lanka
Insects described in 1894